Tung Chung West is the proposed MTR terminus station of the , west of Tung Chung, Lantau Island, New Territories, Hong Kong, which would follow on from Tung Chung station. When Yat Tung Estate (Trad. Chinese: 逸東邨) in Tung Chung West was constructed, the MTR Corporation and the Hong Kong SAR Government reserved a site to build the station. Due to insufficient population there, the station has so far not been constructed. If the station does open, it would replace  as the westernmost railway station in Hong Kong.

History 
On 18 February 2009, the government replied to the Legislative Council that a decision or timetable for the construction of Tung Chung West Station was not available for the time being.

In 2013, Tung Chung West Extension was mentioned in the review and update of the Railway Development Strategy 2000, after the government launched the "Tung Chung New Town Extension Study" in 2012 to further expand and develop Tung Chung New Town. The updated strategy, released in September 2014 as the Railway Development Strategy 2014 (RDS-2014), confirms that planning is indeed underway to build the Tung Chung West extension, and that the projected cost is $6 billion. An "implementation window" of 2020 to 2024 was noted.

The New Lantao Bus company, which currently operates a circular bus route between Yat Tung Estate and Tung Chung station, petitioned the Legislative Council against construction of the new station.

See also
 Tung Chung East station

References

Tung Chung
Proposed railway stations in Hong Kong
MTR stations in the New Territories